Nusratlı can refer to:

 Nusratlı, Ayvacık
 Nusratlı, Bolvadin